Euleechia miranda is a moth of the family Erebidae. It was described by Charles Oberthür in 1894. It is found in Tibet and Yunnan in China.

References

Callimorphina
Moths described in 1894